The Royal Central School of Speech and Drama was founded by Elsie Fogerty in 1906, as The Central School of Speech Training and Dramatic Art, to offer a new form of training in speech and drama for young actors and other students. It became a constituent college of the University of London in 2005 and is a member of Conservatoires UK and the Federation of Drama Schools.

Courses
The school offers undergraduate, postgraduate, research degrees and short courses in acting, actor training, applied theatre, theatre crafts and making, design, drama therapy, movement, musical theatre, performance, producing, research, scenography, stage management, teacher training, technical arts, voice and writing.

History

In 2006, the Webber Douglas Academy of Dramatic Art was absorbed into Central.

On 29 November 2012, the 'Royal' title was bestowed on the school by Queen Elizabeth II in recognition of its reputation as a "world-class institution for exceptional professional training in theatre and performance studies". It is entitled to use it in official documentation, although it continues to be colloquially referred to as "Central". The school's Patron, Princess Alexandra of Kent, played a role in recommending the institution for the title.

Buildings
The school is located at Swiss Cottage in North London, an area which is being redeveloped as a "civic and cultural quarter" which includes a new extension building for the school, replacing 1960s accommodation. The school's theatre is located inside the new building which was awarded a BREEAM rating of "very good".

Administration

Past presidents of the school include Laurence Olivier and Judi Dench. In October 2008 Harold Pinter, who attended the school in 1950–51, became its president, succeeding Peter Mandelson. He was to receive an honorary fellowship in December 2008, but had to receive it in absentia because of ill health; he died two weeks later. Michael Grandage became  president in 2010.

Former presidents
 Harold Pinter (2008)
 Peter Mandelson (2001 to 2008)
 Judi Dench (1992 to 1997)
 Peggy Ashcroft (1989 to 1992)
 Laurence Olivier (1983 to 1989)

Research 
In the 2008 Research Assessment Exercise the majority of Central's submission was judged "world leading" or "internationally excellent". The school has been ranked highly by The Guardian, placing it sixth in its league table of specialist institutions and ninth for Drama and Dance.

The school has over 20 doctoral candidates and the first graduate of the programme, Broderick Chow, was awarded his PhD at the December 2010 graduation ceremony.

Alumni

References

External links
 "Education Guide" (Higher Education) in The Guardian
  The Royal Central School of Speech and Drama – Official Website

1906 establishments in England
Drama schools in London
Educational institutions established in 1906
 
Universities UK
University of London